The 2019 Carlow Senior Football Championship is the 119th edition of the Carlow GAA's premier club gaelic football tournament for senior graded clubs in County Carlow, Ireland. The tournament consists of 8 teams, with the winner going on to represent Carlow in the Leinster Senior Club Football Championship. The championship starts with a group stage and then progresses to a knock out stage.

Éire Óg were the defending champions after they defeated Rathvilly in the previous years final.

This was Ballinabranna's return to the senior grade after claiming the 2018 Carlow Intermediate Football Championship title, thus ending a 3-year exodus since being relegated in 2016.

Team changes

The following teams have changed division since the 2018 championship season.

To S.F.C.
Promoted from 2019 Carlow Intermediate Football Championship
 Ballinabranna -  (Intermediate Champions)

From S.F.C.
Relegated to 2019 Carlow Intermediate Football Championship
 O'Hanrahans

Group stage

There are two groups of four teams. The top two teams in each group compete in the semi-finals. The bottom team in each group compete in the relegation Final.

Group A

Round 1
 Old Leighlin 0-11, 1-7 Tinryland, 25/7/2019.
 Éire Óg 3-15, 1-9 Ballinabranna, 28/7/2019.

Round 2
 Éire Óg 0-11, 0-10 Old Leighlin, 11/8/2019.
 Tinryland 1-10, 0-11 Ballinabranna, 10/8/2019.

Round 3
 Old Leighlin 2-9, 1-11 Ballinabranna, 24/8/2019.
 Tinryland 2-7, 1-7 Éire Óg, 24/8/2019.

Group B

Round 1
 Rathvilly 3-14, 2-12 Bagenalstown Gaels, 26/7/2019. 
 Palatine 0-15, 2-5 Mount Leinster Rangers, 26/7/2019.

Round 2
 Rathvilly 1-13, 0-4 Mount Leinster Rangers, 9/8/2019. 
 Bagenalstown Gaels 1-09, 0-11 Palatine, 11/8/2019.
Round 3
 Bagenalstown Gaels 3-8, 1-12 Mount Leinster Rangers, 25/8/2019.
 Rathvilly 2-9, 0-15 Palatine, 25/8/2019.

Knock-out stages

Finals
The winners and runners up of each group qualify for the quarter finals.

Quarter-finals

Semi-finals

Final

Relegation play off

Leinster Senior Club Football Championship

References

 

Carlow Senior Football Championship
Carlow Senior Football Championship
Carlow SFC